Polyascus is a genus of barnacles in infraclass Rhizocephala. It was circumscribed in 2003 by Henrik Glenner, Jørgen Lützen, and Tohru Takahashi. They included three species, all transferred from Sacculina. The generic name polyascus (poly "many" + ascus "bag") refers to the typical presence of multiple external sac-like female bodies, known as externae. In Polyascus species, these originate from asexual reproduction.

Species

, WoRMS recognizes the following three species,
all included in the genus's circumscription.

References

Barnacles
Parasites of crustaceans
Parasitic crustaceans
Crustacean genera